Don's Fountain of Youth is a 1953 American animated short film by Walt Disney Productions featuring Donald Duck.

Plot

Donald and his nephews are in Donald's car on vacation in Florida, and pass by an "old Spanish fort" and a flamingo.  The nephews, however, are more interested in their comic book, refusing to look up from it. Donald's car begins to overheat, which sends him scrambling to find a source of water for his radiator. He comes across a small pond with a sign reading "This spring was mistaken for the Fountain Of Youth". Donald decides to use this to trick the boys, with the intent of making them believe Donald is experiencing dramatic reverse aging. Donald breaks off the top half of the sign, leaving only the bottom portion reading "The Fountain of Youth," and yells for help to get the boys' attention. The boys find Donald wearing a baby bonnet and exhibiting baby-like behavior, including tearing pages from their comic book. "Baby" Donald's outlandish behavior causes the boys to decide that some discipline is called for, and the boys go off to find a tree branch to use as a switch. However, Donald uses this time to steal an egg from a nearby sleeping crocodile, place it where he had just been standing, and put his baby bonnet on it to fool the boys into thinking he has further regressed to an egg. Donald watches from a nearby hiding spot alongside the very crocodile he stole the egg from (who had just woken up from Donald sitting on him). As the boys lament losing their Uncle to the reverse aging process, Donald attempts to share a laugh with the crocodile, who soon discovers that his egg is missing and Donald is the culprit. Enraged, the crocodile whacks Donald on the head with his tail and a dazed Donald sits on his egg. He then chases the triplets for the egg and they throw it to coincidentally where Donald is. As Donald gets out of his daze from having the egg bounce off him, the two crocodile eggs hatch, imprinting the baby crocodiles into thinking Donald is in fact their dad. After further time spent evading the crocodile, Donald suffers a concussion that puts him into a stupor, after which the boys see him stumbling. Reuniting with the triplets, the baby crocodiles come up to Donald excitedly and Donald fears about them thinking he is their dad, so they run to the car and make a hasty exit. The babies begin to cry from Donald getting away. The crocodile is reunited with his babies, however due to their earlier imprinting onto Donald, they are terrified at the sight of their biological daddy. The daddy crocodile quacks, which caused his babies to accept him after all.

Voice cast
 Clarence Nash as Donald Duck, Huey, Dewey and Louie

Releases
 1953 – Theatrical release
 1954 – Disneyland, episode #1.4: "The Donald Duck Story" (TV)
 1961 – Walt Disney's Wonderful World of Color, episode #8.11: "Kids Is Kids" (TV)
 1972 – The Mouse Factory, episode #2.1: "Alligators" (TV)
 1978 – Donald Duck's Cartoon Mania (theatrical)
 c. 1983 – Good Morning, Mickey!, episode #68 (TV)
 1990 – The Magical World of Disney: "Donald, the Star-Studded Duck" (TV)
 c. 1992 – Mickey's Mouse Tracks, episode #63 (TV)
 c. 1992 – Donald's Quack Attack, episode #51 (TV)
 1998 – The Ink and Paint Club, episode #1.34: Donald's Nephews (TV)

Home media
The short was released on November 11, 2008 on Walt Disney Treasures: The Chronological Donald, Volume Four: 1951-1961.

Additional releases include:
 2000 – Bonus on Gold Collection DVD release of The Three Caballeros (DVD)
 2006 – Walt Disney's Funny Factory, Vol. 4: Huey Dewey & Louie Vol. 4

References

External links
 
 
 

1953 short films
1953 animated films
1950s Disney animated short films
Donald Duck short films
Films directed by Jack Hannah
Films produced by Walt Disney
Films set in Florida
Films based on mythology
Films scored by Joseph Dubin
1950s English-language films
American animated short films
RKO Pictures short films
RKO Pictures animated short films
Films about ducks
Films about crocodilians
1950s American films